Horndal is a locality situated in Avesta Municipality, Dalarna County, Sweden, with 1,114 inhabitants in 2010.

References 

Populated places in Dalarna County
Populated places in Avesta Municipality